Psychrobacter aquaticus is a Gram-negative, psychrophilic, halotolerant, nonmotile bacterium of the genus Psychrobacter which was isolated from the McMurdo Dry Valley region of Antarctica.

References

Further reading

External links
Type strain of Psychrobacter aquaticus at BacDive -  the Bacterial Diversity Metadatabase
 	

Moraxellaceae
Bacteria described in 2005
Psychrophiles